Physoglenidae is a family of araneomorph spiders first described by Alexander Petrunkevitch in 1928 as a subfamily of Pholcidae. It was later moved to Synotaxidae until a study in 2016 showed that they formed a distinct clade.

Genera

, the World Spider Catalog accepts the following genera:

Calcarsynotaxus Wunderlich, 1995 — Australia
Chileotaxus Platnick, 1990 — Chile
Mangua Forster, 1990 — New Zealand
Meringa Forster, 1990 — New Zealand
Microsynotaxus Wunderlich, 2008 — Australia
Nomaua Forster, 1990 — New Zealand
Pahora Forster, 1990 — New Zealand
Pahoroides Forster, 1990 — New Zealand
Paratupua Platnick, 1990 — Australia
Physoglenes Simon, 1904 — Chile
Runga Forster, 1990 — New Zealand
Tupua Platnick, 1990 — Australia
Zeatupua Fitzgerald & Sirvid, 2009 — New Zealand

References

 
Araneomorphae families